Gerardo Amílcar Ortiz Garza (born 25 March 1989) is a Paraguayan footballer who plays, as of 2019, for Once Caldas from Colombia's Categoría Primera A as a goalkeeper.

Club career
Ortiz was born in Encarnación, and joined Quilmes' youth setup in 2004, aged 15. In June 2010 he signed his first professional deal with the club, being subsequently loaned to Rubio Ñu for one year.

On 20 October 2010 Ortiz made his professional debut, starting in a 1–3 home loss against Libertad for the Paraguayan Primera División championship. He was also a starter four days later, in a 0–3 loss at 3 de Febrero; it were his two only appearances of the campaign.

In the 2011 summer Ortiz returned to Quilmes, being assigned to the reserve team. In February 2012 he signed for Olimpia Asunción, but never appeared in any first team match for the club.

On 7 January 2013 Ortiz moved to Sol de América also in the top division. Initially a backup to Roberto Acosta, he overtook him in the 2014 season, but was again demoted to second-choice in 2015.

At the beginning of 2019, Colombian club Once Caldas confirmed his signing.

References

External links
 
 
 
 

1989 births
Living people
People from Encarnación, Paraguay
Paraguayan footballers
Association football goalkeepers
Paraguayan Primera División players
Categoría Primera A players
Club Rubio Ñu footballers
Club Olimpia footballers
Club Sol de América footballers
Quilmes Atlético Club footballers
Once Caldas footballers
Paraguay under-20 international footballers
Paraguayan expatriate footballers
Paraguayan expatriate sportspeople in Argentina
Expatriate footballers in Argentina
Expatriate footballers in Colombia